Kenner is a surname. Notable people with the surname include:

 Chris Kenner, R&B singer/songwriter popular in the early 1960s
 Duncan F. Kenner, advocate for the Confederate States of America in the 1860s
 George Kenner, (1888-1971), German artist, made 110 paintings and drawings during the First World War while interned as a POW
 Hugh Kenner, Canadian literary scholar and author
 Kevin Kenner, American concert pianist